Nora, NORA, or Norah may refer to:

 Nora (name), a feminine given name

People with the surname
 Arlind Nora (born 1980), Albanian footballer
 Pierre Nora (born 1931), French historian

Places

Australia
 Norah Head, New South Wales, headland on the Central Coast

Canada
 Mount Nora, a mountain on Vancouver Island, British Columbia

Eritrea
 Nora (island), island in the Dahlak Archipelago of Eritrea

Italy
 Nora, Italy, archaeological site in Sardinia

Russia
 Nora (river), a river in the Russian Far East

Sweden
 Nora, Sweden
 Nora Municipality
 Nora and Hjulsjö Mountain District, district of Västmanland

Turkey
 Nora (Cappadocia), a town of ancient Cappadocia, now in Turkey

United States
 Nora, Idaho, an unincorporated community
 Nora, Illinois, village in Jo Daviess County
 Nora, Indianapolis, Indiana, a neighborhood
 Nora, Michigan, a former settlement
 Nora, Nebraska, village in Nuckolls County
 Nora, Virginia, unincorporated town in Dickenson County
 Nora, Wisconsin, unincorporated community in Dane County
 Nora Township, Clearwater County, Minnesota
 Nora Township, Jo Daviess County, Illinois
 Nora Township, Pope County, Minnesota
 Nora School, a high school in Silver Spring, Maryland

Zimbabwe
 Glen Norah, Harare, high-density suburb

Films
 Nora (1923 film), German drama, silent film directed by Berthold Viertel
 Nora (1944 film), German drama directed by Harald Braun
 Nora (2000 film), directed by Pat Murphy, about Nora Barnacle and her husband James Joyce
 Nora (2008 film), South African documentary directed by Alla Kovgan and David Hinton

Music
 NORA (band), hardcore band
 "Nora", a song by The Long Winters from the 2003 album When I Pretend to Fall
 "Nora", a song written by Irving Berlin 1927–31
 "Nora", an alternative name for the folk song "When You and I Were Young, Maggie"

Organizations
 Nora Industrier, a Norwegian manufacturer of soft drinks and foodstuffs
 Restaurant Nora, an organic restaurant in Washington, D.C., United States
 National Occupational Research Agenda, United States

Television 
 Nora (TV series), from Venezuela
 Nora (The Flash episode), a 2018 episode of The Flash
 Nora Allen (The Flash), Barry Allen's mother in the TV series The Flash
 Nora West-Allen, Barry and Iris' daughter in the TV series The Flash
 Nora Thunderman, a character from the TV series The Thundermans on Nickelodeon

Weapons
 Gun-howitzer M84 NORA, a Yugoslav-made weapon
 Nora B-52, a Serbian self-propelled howitzer

Other uses
 783 Nora, minor planet orbiting the Sun
 Menora (dance), traditional Thai dance drama
 National Online Repository of the Arts in Singapore, co-founded by Madeleine Lee (writer)
 Nora (cat), celebrity animal famous for playing piano
 Nora (EWTC show), a  theatre show by the East West Theatre Company, Sarajevo, Bosnia and Herzegovina
 Nora Stone, an ancient inscription found at Nora, Italy
 Nora (2022 storm), a 2022 cyclone over northwestern Europe
 Tropical Storm Nora, several storms